Lalli is an apocryphal character from Finnish history. According to the legend, he killed Bishop Henry on the ice of lake Köyliönjärvi in Finland on January 20, 1156.

Legend 
The story begins with an expedition of one of the first Christian missionaries in Finland, Bishop Henry, during the alleged first crusade of Sweden. In midst of travelling, he and his entourage stop by a local dwelling. Only the matron of the house, Kerttu, is home. Bishop Henry asks for food and hay for the horses, but the matron refuses him. Bishop Henry and his men then forcibly take the food and hay before continuing on with their journey. After they are gone, Lalli, the husband of Kerttu, returns and hears of what has happened. When Lalli hears of the bishop ransacking his home, he becomes enraged and leaves to pursue the bishop. Lalli then catches up to the bishop on top of a frozen lake, storied to be Köyliönjärvi. At Bishop Henry's bidding his entourage flees and hides in a nearby forest. The bishop tries to calm the angered man, but Lalli strikes and kills Henry with an axe.

There are numerous versions as to how Lalli then met his own gruesome fate, but in general Lalli takes the bishop's mitre to wear it pompously and cuts off the bishop's finger to snatch his valuable ring. But the mitre becomes fused to Lalli's head and when he tries to remove it, it tears his scalp off with it. When Lalli tries to remove the bishop's ring from his finger, it likewise tears his finger off. Lalli runs off to the woods, where mice or rats corner him to a tree. Lalli falls from the tree into a pond and drowns. The bishop's body parts are collected by his servants and transported with oxen towards the south. Where the oxen stopped became the site of the first church in Finland.

The legend is enshrined in a famous Finnish folk poem called Henrikin surma ("The Slaying of Henry"). The poem includes such characters as a talking statue of Christ. One of the versions of the poem is found in the Kanteletar, a collection of old Finnish folk poetry.

Cultural significance
Lalli is a well-known figure in Finnish folklore. He has been depicted as a figure prostrated at the feet of the Bishop Henry in wooden statues. The name Lalli is not common in Finland; it may be a form of "Laurentius", and is also said to be a name for the bear (traditionally saying the actual name of the animal was avoided, so the use of nicknames arose). Also, in the Finnish toponymy Lalli occurs, for example, in Pirkkala, where there is both the place name Lalli and Lallin lahti ("Lalli Bay") on the shores of Lake Pyhäjärvi.

In the television series Suuret suomalaiset – the Finnish version of 100 Greatest Britons – Lalli was chosen as the 14th greatest Finn. Lalli used to be generally viewed as an evil-doer along with his wife, but in the 20th century he also became viewed as sort of a rebel pagan against imperialism and forced conversion of the Northern Crusades.

Satakunta
Lalli's axe, along with Bishop Henrik's mitre feature in the coat of arms of the former municipality of Köyliö and now from 2015 the merged Säkylä. There is a statue of Lalli in Köyliö designed by Aimo Tukiainen, as well as two prominent relics in Satakunta: Lalli's hut and Lalli's tombstone. Both are, according to legend, places where Lalli took refuge after killing the bishop. Lalli's hut is located in Lootinnummi in Köyliö. There has been no actual archeological evidence that the mound of stone was once a house, but folklore claims that it was. 13 km away from Lalli's alleged hut is Lalli's tombstone: a boulder by Lake Hiirijärvi said to be still damp with Lalli's tears. This area has been called Lalli's farm. Lake Hiirijärvi ("Lake Mouse") allegedly received its name from the Lalli myth. Martti Haavio, a researcher of Finnish mythology, theorised that this was not part of the original story, but added later on. It is possible that the legends marking these areas as Lalli's settlements were manufactured by the church, as it would grant them rights to the land.

In modern popular culture 
The story of Lalli and Henry’s death on the lake is the subject of the song Köyliönjärven jäällä, by Finnish metal band Moonsorrow.

Historicity

Although often considered a fictional story as there are no records of a Bishop Henry (as pointed out in research by historian Tuomas Heikkilä), new research by linguist Mikko Heikkilä claims that Bishop Henry was in fact a German missionary named Heinrich. He claims to have found records that state a missionary by the name of Heinrich (or "Heinärikki" as called by Finns) was slain in the early 12th century, only a few decades before the Bishop Henry of legend. According to him the fictional character of Bishop Henry was mostly based on Heinrich but was then conflated with the legend of Eric IX of Sweden, who is also storied to have met his end gruesomely murdered. Tuomas Heikkilä doubts this version of the events and states that Mikko Heikkilä combines different sources liberally.

Gallery

References

External links
 

Finnish mythology
Finnish murderers